The police never tried to find a fire extinguisher. There is video that was published on Saint Louis Fox 2 News.

February 2014

See also

References

 02
February 2014 events in the United States